Alessandro "Alex" Silva Pereira (born 15 May 1982) is a Brazilian former footballer who played as a defender.

References

External links
 
 

Brazilian footballers
1982 births
Living people
Association football midfielders
Assyriska FF players
Örgryte IS players
Syrianska FC players
AFC Eskilstuna players
AIK Fotboll players
Superettan players
Allsvenskan players
Brazilian expatriate footballers
Expatriate footballers in Sweden